was a district located in Miyagi Prefecture, Japan.

On March 31, 2006, the towns of Kashimadai, Matsuyama and Sanbongi were merged with the city of Furukawa, the towns of Iwadeyama and Naruko (both from Tamatsukuri District), and the town of Tajiri (from Tōda District) to create the city of Ōsaki. Tamatsukuri District and Shida District were dissolved as a result of this merger.

Former towns and villages
Kashimadai
Matsuyama
Sanbongi

History
April, 1869 - Shida District is added to Wakuya Prefecture (涌谷県)
August, 1869  - Wakuya Prefecture becomes Toyone Prefecture (登米県)
1871 - With the Abolition of the han system, becomes attached to Sendai Prefecture (仙台県), now Miyagi Prefecture
1889 - With the establishment of the modern municipal system, Furukawa Town (古川町), Arao? Village (荒雄村), Shida Village (志田村), Shikitama? Village (敷玉村), Takakura? Village (高倉村), Matsuyama Village (松山村), Shimoibano Village (下伊場野村), Sambongi Village (三本木村), and Kashimadai Village (鹿島台村) established
1890 - Matsuyama becomes a town
1894 - District offices established in Furukawa Town
1895 - Sambongi becomes a town
1926 - District offices abolished
1950 - Furukawa becomes a city (Furukawa, Miyagi)
1951 - Kashimadai becomes a town
March 31, 2006 - the towns of Kashimadai, Matsuyama and Sanbongi were merged with the city of Furukawa, the towns of Iwadeyama and Naruko (both from Tamatsukuri District), and the town of Tajiri (from Tōda District) to create the city of Ōsaki. Tamatsukuri District and Shida District were dissolved as a result of this merger.

Former districts of Miyagi Prefecture